Save and Protect (Russian: Spasi i sokhrani) is a 1989 Soviet drama film directed by Russian filmmaker Aleksandr Sokurov. It depicts the decline of a childlike woman as she engages in adultery and falls into crippling debt. It is loosely adapted from Gustave Flaubert's novel Madame Bovary.

References

External links

Soviet drama films
Films based on Madame Bovary
1989 drama films
1989 films